Libertador Avenue is a major avenue in Montevideo, Uruguay. It stretches north from the Legislative Palace in Aguada to Plaza Fabini in Centro, and is named after Juan Antonio Lavalleja, revolutionary figure and politician, who led the group of the Thirty-Three Orientals in the insurrection for the independence of Oriental Province.

History and description 
In its beginnings it was called Agraciada Avenue, but in the 1920s the Agraciada Diagonal project was carried out, which consisted of widening the road, which required the demolition of buildings such as the original façade of the Church of Our Lady of the Mount Carmel. The new diagonal joined the Legislative Palace, which was inaugurated in 1925, with the central business district. In the 1940s, buildings such as the headquarters of the State Insurance Bank and the National Administration of Fuels, Alcohol and Portland (ANCAP) were erected.

Libertador Avenue crosses Isabella I of Castile Square, located one block from the General Artigas railway station, and is where the President and Vice President parade to Plaza Independencia after taking the oath at the General Assembly in each inauguration.

Gallery

Landmarks 
The main landmarks across this avenue are:
 Plaza Fabini
 Banco de Seguros del Estado
 Automóvil Club del Uruguay
 Edificio ANCAP
 Tiendas Introzzi
 Basílica Nuestra Señora del Carmen
 Instituto de Profesores Artigas
 Palacio Legislativo

References

External links

Streets in Montevideo
Centro, Montevideo
Aguada, Montevideo